The  is a regular limited express service operated by East Japan Railway Company (JR East) and Fuji Kyuko, between Shinjuku on the Chūō Line (some services extended to Chiba on the Chūō-Sobu Line) and Kawaguchiko on the Fujikyuko Line.

Summary 
Services begins operation with the implementation on the timetable revision on 16 March 2019. It is the first routinely operated limited express between JR and Fuji Kyuko.

Service pattern 
Two or three round trips are operated per day, and these services are coupled with Azusa or Kaiji services (with the same train number) between Ōtsuki and Shinjuku.  Sometimes Fuji Excursion operates itself only.

Stops 
(Chiba → Funabashi → Kinshichō → ) Shinjuku - Tachikawa - Hachiōji - Ōtsuki - Tsurubunkadaigakumae - Shimoyoshida - Mt. Fuji - Fujikyu-Highland - Kawaguchiko

Rolling stock 
All services are operated by E353 series 3-car sets, numbered 1 to 3, with car 1 at the Shinjuku end. Between Ōtsuki and Shinjuku, the train will couple with the Azusa or the Kaiji, which is numbered cars 4 to 12.

Ticketing 
A limited express ticket has to be purchased to board the Fuji Excursion train, along with the basic fare ticket.

The Reserved Seat Ticket enables a specified seat to be reserved for the holder. The reserved status for the seat is signified by a green overhead lamp on top of the corresponding seat.

The Unreserved Seat Ticket enables the holder to be seated on any unreserved seat. A red overhead lamp signifies that the seat is unreserved; while a yellow overhead lamp signifies that the seat is reserved for the later part of the journey, implying that one has to give up their seat to the passenger who has reserved the seat, when they board the train later.

Passengers holding the Japan Rail Pass may ride free of charge between Shinjuku and Ōtsuki station. A supplementary ticket is needed to travel further than Otsuki, as the line is no longer operated by JR East. Ticket for this section can be purchased in advance at stations from Fuji-kyuko, or on the train. JR East can not sell tickets and reservations that contains only the section of Fuji-kyuko.

History
 14 December 2018: Service announced
 16 March 2019: Service begins

See also 

 List of named passenger trains of Japan
 Kaiji, another limited express service that the Fuji Excursion would couple with

References
This article incorporates material from the corresponding article in the Japanese Wikipedia.

External links

East Japan Railway Company
Named passenger trains of Japan
Railway services introduced in 2019
2019 establishments in Japan